Tony Danker (born 1971) is a British businessman, and was the director-general of the Confederation of British Industry (CBI) from November 2020 to March 2023.

Early life
Danker was born in 1971 in Belfast, Northern Ireland. He was educated at Belfast Royal Academy, and earned a law degree from the University of Manchester. He took a career break to study for a Master of Public Administration (MPA) at Harvard University, which he completed in 2005.

Danker was chair of the Union of Jewish Students from 1993 to 1994.

Career
After leaving the University of Manchester, he worked for the former Chief Rabbi, the late Lord Jonathan Sacks, from 1994 to 1996. From 1998 to 2008, he was a consultant with McKinsey. From 2008 to 2010, during the Brown Ministry, he was a special adviser to HM Treasury. From 2010 to 2017, he was international director then chief strategy officer at Guardian News and Media, which publishes The Guardian and The Observer.

From 2017 to 2020, he was chief executive of Be the Business, a government and industry-funded body launched by George Osborne that aims to make British companies more productive. In June 2020, it was announced that he would be the next director general of the Confederation of British Industry (CBI): he succeeded Carolyn Fairbairn in November 2020.

In 2023, Danker stepped aside after accusations arose of inappropriate workplace conduct involving a female employee earlier in the year. The CBI announced that it would be independently investigating the accusations. Dankner has been accused of unwanted contact and sexual harassment.

Views
In November 2022, Danker said higher growth was needed and otherwise the UK would not afford the growing health and social care costs.  Danker said Hunt's statement had been "all about fighting inflation and getting the government budget in some decent shape and that does need to be done.   There was really nothing there that tells us the economy is going to avoid another decade of low productivity and low growth".

Personal life
Danker is married, with two sons, and lives in London. He is Jewish.

References

1971 births
Living people
Alumni of the University of Manchester
Harvard Kennedy School alumni
The Guardian people
Jews from Northern Ireland
McKinsey & Company people
Businesspeople from Belfast
British management consultants
British special advisers